The Central District of Khur and Biabanak County is a district (bakhsh) in Khur and Biabanak County, Isfahan Province, Iran. At the 2006 census, its population was 17,488, in 4,924 families.  The district has three cities: Biabanak, Farrokhi, and Khur. The district has three rural districts (dehestan): Biabanak Rural District, Jandaq Rural District, and Nakhlestan Rural District.

References 

Khur and Biabanak County
Districts of Isfahan Province